The concept of border security in the United States shares a complex relationship with the persistent threat of terrorism.  Border security includes the protection of land borders, ports, and airports.  The relationship is unique in the sense that the federal government must constantly reevaluate and tweak its border security policy to address the perceived threats posed to the United States through the form of human terrorism or the smuggling and detonation of a weapon of mass destruction.

Historical context 
Immediately after the events of September 11, 2001, the Federal Government placed a higher priority on obvious aspects of homeland security, such as intelligence reform, as opposed to border security. However, the government as well as the American public eventually reasoned that in order for a high-magnitude attack like September 11 to occur, something had to be seriously wrong with the border security apparatuses that were in place at the time. After all, every single one of the terrorist hijackers on September 11 had been a recipient of a temporary U.S tourist visa, which means they were legally allowed to be in the United States. However, the American public also questions why cracking down on illegal entries will hinder the ability of terrorists who enter the country legally.

Ever since September 11, many actions have been taken to improve border security in the United States.  The creation of the Department of Homeland Security in 2002 as well as the implementation of many new policies and procedures (both classified and unclassified) has without a doubt made America's borders, ports, and airports safer than they were in 2001.  However, there is no question that the threats posed by terrorism via America's land borders, ports, and airports still exist; and there are still questions as to whether the United States is truly safe from another attack.

Threats of terrorism

Land borders

The sheer sizes of both the Canada–US and Mexico–US borders present the Federal Government's security forces with challenges with regards to their ability to protect the homeland.  According to a 2004 report from the Congressional Research Service, there are "great difficulties in securing the many points through which people and goods may enter legally, and the thousands of miles of ‘lines’, thinly guarded stretches of coasts and land borders which entry is illegal."

Given the phenomenon of undocumented migration at the U.S.-Mexico border, some government officials and political candidates have made public statements referring to the threat of terrorists crossing the Southwest border. However, as the Washington Office on Latin America's Border Fact Check blog has pointed out, the Mexico section of the State Department's 2012 Country Reports on Terrorism notes that "No known international terrorist organization had an operational presence in Mexico and no terrorist group targeted U.S. citizens in or from Mexican territory.", and in 2011 the Department of Homeland Security affirmed that it did not have "any credible information on terrorist groups operating along the Southwest border."

Ports
The Federal Government faces threats to national security through its many ports. As part of her testimony at a Congressional Hearing on container security, JayEtta Hecker, Director for Physical Infrastructure Issues at the Government Accountability Office, said "drugs and illegal aliens are routinely smuggled into this country, not only in small boats but also hidden among otherwise legitimate cargoes on large commercial ships.  These same pathways are available for exploitation by a terrorist organization or any nation or person wishing to attack us surreptitiously."  Ms. Hecker's testimony also touched on the fact that the sheer number of cargo containers that enter the United States augments this threat. According to the March 2008 edition of Scientific American, more than 42 million  containers enter American ports each year.

Airports
More than 87 million people enter the U.S. every year through airports, which makes them a primary point of entry for potential terrorists. For example, in May 2012, the C.I.A. revealed that it uncovered a plot to bring down a commercial plane using explosive devices. According to the C.I.A. these plans belonged to members of Al Qaeda.

The story of Ra’ed al-Banna demonstrates that the threat of an attack of this manner still exists.

Current policies and security mechanisms

Land borders
In a 2008 article for the Manhattan Institute, Rudolph Giuliani claimed that border security is one of the most critical issues facing the United States today and should by monitored by a single organization that embraced CompStat, the organizational philosophy of the NYPD.  A myriad of agencies guard America's land borders, including the United States Border Patrol, U.S. Immigration and Customs Enforcement(ICE), the Department of Homeland Security, and the National Guard.

The Department of Homeland Security has completed nearly 700 miles of fencing along the borders. The Department of Homeland Security have reported that 20,700 border patrol agents in 2011. In addition, the Border Patrol now has more than 18,300 agents deployed on both the southern and northern border. The Department of Homeland Security uses technology along the border such as unattended ground sensors, truck-mounted mobile surveillance systems, remote video surveillance systems, unmanned aerial systems, fixed- and rotary-wing aircraft, and the Augmented Integrated Surveillance Intelligence System (ISIS).

Ports

From 2001 to 2006, the Federal Government increased funding for port security by 700%.  This increase in funding allowed the Department of Homeland Security to implement a defense in depth against external threats.  U.S. Customs and Border Protection, the U.S. Coast Guard, Terminal Operator, and the Port Authority shared responsibility for providing security at American ports. In 2006, those agencies screened all cargo entering the country.  U.S. Customs and Border Patrol utilized X-ray, gamma ray machines, and radiation detection devices to screen cargo, operating over 680 radiation portal monitors and over 170 large scale non-intrusive inspection devices. In addition, there were more than 600 canine teams that could "identify narcotics, bulk currency, human beings, explosives, agricultural pests, and chemical weapons" working U.S. ports of entry.

Airports
Airport security mechanisms must be quick, efficient, and effective due to the massive numbers of travelers, the Department of Homeland Security has implemented the Automated Targeting System, a data mining program.  The Automated Targeting System works by collecting information from airlines such as passport data, credit card numbers, and identity information. That information is then run against a list of known terrorists, phone numbers connected to terrorist cells, and other pertinent intelligence data.

On November 19, 2001, the United States passed the Aviation and Transportation Security Act, creating the Transportation Security AdministrationTSA,  and requiring airlines to give information of all U.S. bound travelers to the Department of Homeland Security.  This data is fed into the Automated Targeting System  and helps TSA, FBI, CIA, and other organizations to create the Selectee and No Fly List.

In addition to the ATS System, another mechanism to deter terrorists is utilized in case they are not detected by the flagging protocols. Federal Air Marshals are the law enforcement branch of the Transportation Security Administration. They fly either in uniform or incognito and act as the law enforcement while on board to protect passengers and crew members from criminals and terrorists.

The Secondary Security Screening Selection system flags passengers for extra surveillance while in the airport but does not prohibit them from flying. These individuals, often referred to as "selectees", are pulled aside at security checkpoints and searched thoroughly. Their luggage may be hand searched. Individuals are added to the lists through airport screening processes. Individuals are potentially flagged if they have purchased a ticket in cash, purchased a ticket within the previous 24 hours, purchased a one-way ticket, or arrived with no baggage.

Starting in March 2010, the TSA begin a wide-scale deployment of Full body scanners, in addition to metal detectors, to physically screen airline passengers.

Effectiveness of US-Mexico Border Security Policies

Some evidence exists that past border security efforts have been successful. Between 2010 and 2012, DHS seized almost three quarters more money, over a third more narcotics, and nearly double the weapons seized between 2006 and 2008 along the Southwest border. Furthermore, due to the increased border security, border cities have become some of the safest in the United States. Southwest border states have experienced an average 40% drop in violent crime rates, and the 4 major cities with the lowest crime rates in the US are all in border states.

Controversy

The No Fly List, a comprehensive list of individuals prohibited from flying into or out of the United States, has exponentially grown in size. The List existed before 9/11 but only contained the names of 16 people and now lists over one million names. The List includes high-profile individuals such as the Bolivian President and other foreign dignitaries. The List still contains 14 out of the 19 September 11 hijackers and several other deceased individuals.

The system occasionally leads to a "false positive" which is the accidental flagging of individuals that have similar names to suspected terrorists or are on the List for illegitimate reason. In some cases, children under the age of five have been flagged as suspects. It contains many common names such as Gary Smith or Robert Johnson which makes traveling very difficult for all individuals with that name. Several U.S. congressmen have name matches on the list including Senator Ted Kennedy, who has subsequently been stopped at airports. The List does not include the names of individuals involved in the liquid explosive terrorist attack attempt. TSA also reported that some of the names of the most dangerous terrorists are not on the list in case the List is leaked. Daniel Brown, a U.S. Marine returning from Iraq, was denied entry into the United States because his name matched one on the list. He later found out that he had been flagged on a previous flight for having gunpowder residue on his boots which was likely acquired during an earlier tour of duty in Iraq.

As an alternative to a full body scan, airline passengers can opt for a pat down.

See also
Advance Passenger Information System
 American entry into Canada by land

References

Politics of the United States
Borders of the United States
Counterterrorism in the United States